George Roche was an Irish Gaelic footballer. His championship career at senior level with the Dublin county team lasted six seasons from 1891 until 1896.

Career

Roche first played competitive football with the Young Irelands club. He won five county senior championship medals with the club between 1891 and 1896.

Young Irelands represented Dublin in the championship, with Roche making his inter-county debut during the 1891 championship. Over the following six seasons, he won three All-Ireland medals. Roche also won four Leinster medals.

Honours
Young Irelands
Dublin Senior Football Championship: 1891, 1892, 1893, 1894, 1896

Dublin
All-Ireland Senior Football Championship: 1891, 1892, 1894
Leinster Senior Football Championship: 1891, 1892, 1894, 1896 (c)

References

1942 deaths
Dublin inter-county Gaelic footballers